Dato' Loke Yuen Yow (born 10 September 1952) is a Malaysian politician. He was the Member of Parliament for Tanjong Malim from 1986 to 2008 and Deputy Minister of Youth and Sports during 1995-1999. His biggest achievement in Ministry of Youth and Sports is the organization of 1998 Commonwealth Games led by the minister Tan Sri Muhyiddin Yassin.

Politics

Proposal to appoint President of MCA as second Deputy Prime Minister 
He proposed to the then Prime Minister, Najib Tun Razak to establish a second Prime Minister post and appoint a Malaysian Chinese for the post as a sign of sharing power in 2009. At that time, he was a Minister in the Prime Minister Department and also the Secretary General of Malaysian Chinese Association.

Election results

Honours
  :
  Member of the Order of the Perak State Crown (AMP) (1986)
  Knight Commander of the Order of the Perak State Crown (DPMP) – Dato' (1989)
 Justice of the Peace (JP) (2002)

References 

20th-century Malaysian politicians
21st-century Malaysian politicians
Place of birth missing (living people)
Malaysian Chinese Association politicians
Members of the Dewan Rakyat
Malaysian people of Chinese descent
Malaysian politicians of Chinese descent
Living people
1952 births